Septoria helianthi is a fungal plant pathogen infecting sunflowers.

References

External links 
 Index Fungorum
 USDA ARS Fungal Database

helianthi
Fungi described in 1883
Fungal plant pathogens and diseases
Sunflower diseases